John Bishop (born 1966) is an English comedian.

John Bishop may also refer to:

 John Bisshop, MP for Gloucestershire from 1305 to 1313
 John Bishop (MP), Member of Parliament (MP) for Wycombe in 1430
 John Bishop (surgeon) (1797–1873), English surgeon and medical writer
 John Bishop (19th century), body snatcher, one of the London Burkers
 John Bishop (cricketer) (1891–1963), English cricketer
 John Peale Bishop (1892–1944), American poet
 John Bishop (academic) (1903–1964), Australian academic and conductor
 John Bishop (editor), head of Harvard Journal of Asiatic Studies, 1958–1974
 John Bishop (screenwriter) (1929–2006), Broadway playwright and director and Hollywood screenwriter
 J. Michael Bishop (born 1936), American immunologist and microbiologist
 John Melville Bishop (born 1946), American documentary filmmaker
 John Bishop (sportscaster), American play-by-play broadcaster
 John Bishop, American jazz drummer and founder of Origin Records
 John Bishop, founder of Dreamland Bar-B-Que
 John Bishop, founder of US based motorsport sanctioning body, International Motor Sports Association

See also
 John Climping (died 1262), medieval Catholic Bishop of Chichester, was also known as "John Bishop"
 John Bishop House, listed on the National Register of Historic Places in 1985
 John Bishop Estlin (1785–1855), English ophthalmic surgeon